Unbibium, also known as element 122 or eka-thorium, is the hypothetical chemical element in the periodic table with the placeholder symbol of Ubb and atomic number 122. Unbibium and Ubb are the temporary systematic IUPAC name and symbol respectively, which are used until the element is discovered, confirmed, and a permanent name is decided upon. In the periodic table of the elements, it is expected to follow unbiunium as the second element of the superactinides and the fourth element of the 8th period. Similarly to unbiunium, it is expected to fall within the range of the island of stability, potentially conferring additional stability on some isotopes, especially 306Ubb which is expected to have a magic number of neutrons (184).

Despite several attempts, unbibium has not yet been synthesized, nor have any naturally occurring isotopes been found to exist. There are currently no plans to attempt to synthesize unbibium. In 2008, it was claimed to have been discovered in natural thorium samples, but that claim has now been dismissed by recent repetitions of the experiment using more accurate techniques.

Chemically, unbibium is expected to show some resemblance to cerium and thorium. However, relativistic effects may cause some of its properties to differ; for example, it is expected to have a ground state electron configuration of [Og] 7d1 8s2 8p1 or [Og] 8s2 8p2, despite its predicted position in the g-block superactinide series.

Introduction

History

Synthesis attempts

Fusion-evaporation
Two attempts were made to synthesize unbibium were in the 1970s, both propelled by early predictions on the island of stability at N = 184 and Z > 120, and in particular whether superheavy elements could potentially be naturally occurring. The first attempts to synthesize unbibium were performed in 1972 by Flerov et al. at the Joint Institute for Nuclear Research (JINR), using the heavy-ion induced hot fusion reactions:

 +  → * → no atoms

Another unsuccessful attempt to synthesize unbibium was carried out in 1978 at the GSI Helmholtz Center, where a natural erbium target was bombarded with xenon-136 ions:

 +  → * → no atoms

No atoms were detected and a yield limit of 5 nb (5,000 pb) was measured. Current results (see flerovium) have shown that the sensitivity of these experiments were too low by at least 3 orders of magnitude. In particular, the reaction between 170Er and 136Xe was expected to yield alpha emitters with half-lives of microseconds that would decay down to isotopes of flerovium with half-lives perhaps increasing up to several hours, as flerovium is predicted to lie near the center of the island of stability. After twelve hours of irradiation, nothing was found in this reaction. Following a similar unsuccessful attempt to synthesize unbiunium from 238U and 65Cu, it was concluded that half-lives of superheavy nuclei must be less than one microsecond or the cross sections are very small. More recent research into synthesis of superheavy elements suggests that both conclusions are true.

In 2000, the Gesellschaft für Schwerionenforschung (GSI) Helmholtz Center for Heavy Ion Research performed a very similar experiment with much higher sensitivity:

 +  → * → no atoms

These results indicate that the synthesis of such heavier elements remains a significant challenge and further improvements of beam intensity and experimental efficiency is required. The sensitivity should be increased to 1 fb in the future for more quality results.

Compound nucleus fission
Several experiments studying the fission characteristics of various superheavy compound nuclei such as 306Ubb were performed between 2000 and 2004 at the Flerov Laboratory of Nuclear Reactions. Two nuclear reactions were used, namely 248Cm + 58Fe and 242Pu + 64Ni. The results reveal how superheavy nuclei fission predominantly by expelling closed shell nuclei such as 132Sn (Z = 50, N = 82). It was also found that the yield for the fusion-fission pathway was similar between 48Ca and 58Fe projectiles, suggesting a possible future use of 58Fe projectiles in superheavy element formation.

Claimed discovery as a naturally occurring element
In 2008, a group led by Israeli physicist Amnon Marinov at the Hebrew University of Jerusalem claimed to have found single atoms of unbibium-292 in naturally occurring thorium deposits at an abundance of between 10−11 and 10−12 relative to thorium. This was the first time in 69 years that a new element had been claimed to be discovered in nature, after Marguerite Perey's 1939 discovery of francium. The claim of Marinov et al. was criticized by a part of the scientific community, and Marinov says he has submitted the article to the journals Nature and Nature Physics but both turned it down without sending it for peer review. The unbibium-292 atoms were claimed to be superdeformed or hyperdeformed isomers, with a half-life of at least 100 million years.

A criticism of the technique, previously used in purportedly identifying lighter thorium isotopes by mass spectrometry, was published in Physical Review C in 2008. A rebuttal by the Marinov group was published in Physical Review C after the published comment.

A repeat of the thorium experiment using the superior method of accelerator mass spectrometry (AMS) failed to confirm the results, despite a 100-fold better sensitivity. This result throws considerable doubt on the results of the Marinov collaboration with regards to their claims of long-lived isotopes of thorium, roentgenium, and unbibium. Current understanding of superheavy elements indicates that it is very unlikely for any traces of unbibium to persist in natural thorium samples.

Naming
Using Mendeleev's nomenclature for unnamed and undiscovered elements, unbibium should instead be known as eka-thorium. After the recommendations of the IUPAC in 1979, the element has since been largely referred to as unbibium with the atomic symbol of (Ubb), as its temporary name until the element is officially discovered and synthesized, and a permanent name is decided on. Scientists largely ignore this naming convention, and instead simply refer to unbibium as "element 122" with the symbol of (122), or sometimes even E122 or 122.

Prospects for future synthesis

Every element from mendelevium onward was produced in fusion-evaporation reactions, culminating in the discovery of the heaviest known element oganesson in 2002 and most recently tennessine in 2010. These reactions approached the limit of current technology; for example, the synthesis of tennessine required 22 milligrams of 249Bk and an intense 48Ca beam for six months. The intensity of beams in superheavy element research cannot exceed 1012 projectiles per second without damaging the target and detector, and producing larger quantities of increasingly rare and unstable actinide targets is impractical.
Consequently, future experiments must be done at facilities such as the superheavy element factory (SHE-factory) at the Joint Institute for Nuclear Research (JINR) or RIKEN, which will allow experiments to run for longer stretches of time with increased detection capabilities and enable otherwise inaccessible reactions.

It is possible that fusion-evaporation reactions will not be suitable for the discovery of unbibium or heavier elements. Various models predict increasingly short alpha and spontaneous fission half-lives for isotopes with Z = 122 and N ~ 180 on the order of microseconds or less, rendering detection nearly impossible with current equipment. The increasing dominance of spontaneous fission also may sever possible ties to known nuclei of livermorium or oganesson and make identification and confirmation more difficult; a similar problem occurred in the road to confirmation of the decay chain of 294Og which has no anchor to known nuclei. For these reasons, other methods of production may need to be researched such as multi-nucleon transfer reactions capable of populating longer-lived nuclei. A similar switch in experimental technique occurred when hot fusion using 48Ca projectiles was used instead of cold fusion (in which cross sections decrease rapidly with increasing atomic number) to populate elements with Z > 113.

Nevertheless, several fusion-evaporation reactions leading to unbibium have been proposed in addition to those already tried unsuccessfully, though no institution has immediate plans to make synthesis attempts, instead focusing first on elements 119, 120, and possibly 121. Because cross sections increase with asymmetry of the reaction, a chromium beam would be most favorable in combination with a californium target, especially if the predicted closed neutron shell at N = 184 could be reached in more neutron-rich products and confer additional stability. One possible synthesis of unbibium could occur as follows:

 +  →  + 3 

Should this reaction be successful and alpha decay remain dominant over spontaneous fission, the resultant 300Ubb would decay through 296Ubn which may be populated in cross-bombardment between 249Cf and 50Ti. Although this reaction is one of the most promising options for the synthesis of unbibium in the near future, the maximum cross section is predicted to be 3 fb, one order of magnitude lower than the lowest measured cross section in a successful reaction. The more symmetrical reactions 244Pu + 64Ni and 248Cm + 58Fe have also been proposed and may produce more neutron-rich isotopes. With increasing atomic number, one must also be aware of decreasing fission barrier heights, resulting in lower survival probability of compound nuclei, especially above the predicted magic numbers at Z = 126 and N = 184.

Predicted properties

Nuclear stability and isotopes

The stability of nuclei decreases greatly with the increase in atomic number after plutonium, the heaviest primordial element, so that all isotopes with an atomic number above 101 decay radioactively with a half-life under a day. No elements with atomic numbers above 82 (after lead) have stable isotopes. Nevertheless, because of reasons not very well understood yet, there is a slight increased nuclear stability around atomic numbers 110–114, which leads to the appearance of what is known in nuclear physics as the "island of stability". This concept, proposed by University of California professor Glenn Seaborg, explains why superheavy elements last longer than predicted.

In this region of the periodic table, N = 184 has been suggested as a closed neutron shell, and various atomic numbers have been proposed as closed proton shells, such as Z = 114, 120, 122, 124, and 126. The island of stability would be characterized by longer half-lives of nuclei located near these magic numbers, though the extent of stabilizing effects is uncertain due to predictions of weakening of the proton shell closures and possible loss of double magicity. More recent research predicts the island of stability to instead be centered at beta-stable copernicium isotopes 291Cn and 293Cn, which would place unbibium well above the island and result in short half-lives regardless of shell effects. The increased stability of elements 112–118 has also been attributed to the oblate shape of such nuclei and resistance to spontaneous fission. The same model also proposes 306Ubb as the next spherical doubly magic nucleus, thus defining the true island of stability for spherical nuclei.

A quantum tunneling model predicts the alpha-decay half-lives of unbibium isotopes 284–322Ubb to be on the order of microseconds or less for all isotopes lighter than 315Ubb, highlighting a significant challenge in experimental observation of this element. This is consistent with many predictions, though the exact location of the 1 microsecond border varies by model. Additionally, spontaneous fission is expected to become a major decay mode in this region, with half-lives on the order of femtoseconds predicted for some even–even isotopes due to minimal hindrance resulting from nucleon pairing and loss of stabilizing effects farther away from magic numbers. A 2016 calculation on the half-lives and probable decay chains of isotopes 280–339Ubb yields corroborating results: 280–297Ubb will be proton unbound and possibly decay by proton emission, 298–314Ubb will have alpha half-lives on the order of microseconds, and those heavier than 314Ubb will predominantly decay by spontaneous fission with short half-lives. For the lighter alpha emitters that may be populated in fusion-evaporation reactions, some long decay chains leading down to known or reachable isotopes of lighter elements are predicted. Additionally, the isotopes 308–310Ubb are predicted to have half-lives under 1 microsecond, too short for detection as a result of significantly lower binding energy for neutron numbers immediately above the N = 184 shell closure. Alternatively, a second island of stability with total half-lives of approximately 1 second may exist around Z ~ 124 and N ~ 198, though these nuclei will be difficult or impossible to reach using current experimental techniques. However, these predictions are strongly dependent on the chosen nuclear mass models, and it is unknown which isotopes of unbibium will be most stable. Regardless, these nuclei will be hard to synthesize as no combination of obtainable target and projectile can provide enough neutrons in the compound nucleus. Even for nuclei  reachable in fusion reactions, spontaneous fission and possibly also cluster decay might have significant branches, posing another hurdle to identification of superheavy elements as they are normally identified by their successive alpha decays.

Chemical
Unbibium is predicted to be similar in chemistry to cerium and thorium, which likewise have four valence electrons above a noble gas core, although it may be more reactive. Additionally, unbibium is predicted to belong to a new block of valence g-electron atoms, although the 5g orbital is not expected to start filling until about element 125. The predicted ground-state electron configuration of unbibium is either [Og] 7d1 8s2 8p1 or 8s2 8p2, in contrast to the expected [Og] 5g2 8s2 in which the 5g orbital starts filling at element 121. (The ds2p and s2p2 configurations are expected to be only separated by about 0.02 eV.) In the superactinides, relativistic effects might cause a breakdown of the Aufbau principle and create overlapping of the 5g, 6f, 7d and 8p orbitals; experiments on the chemistry of copernicium and flerovium provide strong indications of the increasing role of relativistic effects. As such, the chemistry of elements following unbibium becomes more difficult to predict.

Unbibium would most likely form a dioxide, UbbO2, and tetrahalides, such as UbbF4 and UbbCl4. The main oxidation state is predicted to be +4, similar to cerium and thorium. A first ionization energy of 5.651 eV and second ionization energy of 11.332 eV are predicted for unbibium; this and other calculated ionization energies are lower than the analogous values for thorium, suggesting that unbibium will be more reactive than thorium.

Notes

References

Bibliography

External links
Chemistry-Blog: Independent analysis of Marinov's 122 claim
Chart of the Nuclides 2014

 
122